Iltaf Ahmed (born on 2 December 1979) is a British Pakistani footballer, who was the number one goalkeeper of Pakistan national football team.

Iltaf was plucked from obscurity when former Pakistan number one Jaffar Khan was unavailable for the 2010 World Cup qualifiers against Iraq. Iltaf was recommended by a member of the national team, Amjad Iqbal and Pakistan football fans who search for eligible Pakistani footballers based aboard.

He was on the bench for the 7-0 hammering by Iraq. For the second leg, Head coach Akhtar Mohiuddin selected him for the starting line up and he made his debut. Iltaf surprised everyone when he prevented Iraq scoring despite their numerous attempts, with the match ending nil-nil. With that performance he became the new number 1.

Iltaf is still club-less and normally plays in the local Saturday and Sunday Leagues. In a mysterious development, despite being called up for the SAFF Cup 2008, Iltaf failed to go to Pakistan and hence was unavailable for the national team camp.

References

1979 births
Living people
Association football goalkeepers
Footballers from Bradford
Pakistani footballers
Pakistan international footballers
British sportspeople of Pakistani descent